Najm Afandi (1893–1975) نجم آفندی was an Urdu poet in India.

Life

Najm Afandi was born in Agra, India in 1893. His father Bazm Afandi was also a poet.

References

External links 
 Najm Afandi, a forgotten poet
 Excerpts from marsia by Najm Afandi

1893 births
1975 deaths
Urdu-language poets from India
20th-century Indian Muslims
Indian male poets
People from Agra
20th-century Indian poets
Poets from Uttar Pradesh
Muhajir people
20th-century Indian male writers